Sycamore Township is one of the twelve townships of Hamilton County, Ohio, United States.  The population was 19,563 as of the 2020 census.

Geography
Located in the northern part of the county, the township has been cut into three "islands" by annexations.  They have the following borders:

Most of the township has been annexed by the various municipalities that the islands border.  The central (or southeastern) "island" of Sycamore Township is occupied by the census-designated places (CDPs) of Dillonvale, Rossmoyne, Kenwood, and Concorde Hills, from west to east. Much of the northern "island" is occupied by the CDPs of Highpoint (north) and Brecon (south).

Name and history

Statewide, the only other Sycamore Township is located in Wyandot County.

Government
The township is governed by a three-member board of trustees, who are elected in November of odd-numbered years to a four-year term beginning on the following January 1. Two are elected in the year after the presidential election and one is elected in the year before it. There is also an elected township fiscal officer, who serves a four-year term beginning on April 1 of the year after the election, which is held in November of the year before the presidential election. Vacancies in the fiscal officership or on the board of trustees are filled by the remaining trustees.

References

External links

Township website
County website

Townships in Hamilton County, Ohio
Townships in Ohio